This uniform polyhedron compound is a composition of 5 great rhombihexahedra, in the same vertex arrangement as the compound of 5 truncated cubes.

Filling 

There is some controversy on how to colour the faces of this polyhedron compound. Although the common way to fill in a polygon is to just colour its whole interior, this can result in some filled regions hanging as membranes over empty space. Hence, the "neo filling" is sometimes used instead as a more accurate filling. In the neo filling, orientable polyhedra are filled traditionally, but non-orientable polyhedra have their faces filled with the modulo-2 method (only odd-density regions are filled in). In addition, overlapping regions of coplanar faces can cancel each other out.

References 
.

Polyhedral compounds